Sebastian Marinel Ghinga (born 12 February 1987) is a Romanian professional footballer who plays as a midfielder for Metalul Buzău. In his career Ghinga also played for teams such as: Aerostar Bacău, Sportul Studențesc or Botoșani, among others.

References

External links
 
 
 

1987 births
Living people
Sportspeople from Bacău
Romanian footballers
Association football midfielders
CS Aerostar Bacău players
FC Sportul Studențesc București players
FC Botoșani players
LPS HD Clinceni players
CS Sportul Snagov players
Sepsi OSK Sfântu Gheorghe players
FC Petrolul Ploiești players
FC Gloria Buzău players
Liga I players
Liga II players
Liga III players